Constanze Moser-Scandolo (born 4 July 1965) is a former World Champion speed skater who competed for East Germany.

Short biography
Born as Constanze Scandolo in Weimar, East Germany, she started skating at the SC Turbine Erfurt skating club in Erfurt where she trained in the same group as Gunda Niemann and Heike Schalling. In 1988, she was at the Winter Olympics in Calgary, slated to compete in the 1,500 m. However, an injury forced her to withdraw just minutes before the start of her race. She had her best year in 1989 when she became World Allround Champion, won silver at the European Allround Championships, and also won the World Cup on the 1,500 m, as well as ending third on the 1,000 m and the 3,000/5,000 m. She also won 4 medals at various German Championships in that same year. In 1990, she won a bronze medal at the World Allround Championships. After the birth of her daughter Elisa Moser on 27 November 1990, she ended her speed skating career. Currently, she works at the Thüringen Department of Economics.

Medals
An overview of medals won by Moser-Scandolo at important championships she participated in, listing the years in which she won each:

Personal records
To put these personal records in perspective, the last column (WR) lists the official world records on the dates that Scandolo-Moser skated her personal records.

Sources
Constanze Scandolo at SkateResults.com
Constanze Moser-Scandolo at DESG (Deutsche Eisschnelllauf Gemeinschaft) (in German)
Personal records from Jakub Majerski's Speedskating Database

1965 births
Living people
Sportspeople from Weimar
People from Bezirk Erfurt
German female speed skaters
Olympic speed skaters of East Germany
Speed skaters at the 1988 Winter Olympics
World Allround Speed Skating Championships medalists
20th-century German women